In general relativity, the quadrupole formula describes the rate at which gravitational waves are emitted from a system of masses based on the change of the (mass) quadrupole moment. The formula reads

It is useful to express the gravitational wave strain in the transverse traceless gauge, which is given by a similar formula where  is the traceless part of the mass quadrupole moment.

The total energy (luminosity) carried away by gravitational waves is

The formula was first obtained by Albert Einstein in 1918. After a long history of debate on its physical correctness, observations of energy loss due to gravitational radiation in the Hulse–Taylor binary discovered in 1974 confirmed the result, with agreement up to 0.2 percent (by 2005).

See also 

 Multipole radiation
 Birkhoff's theorem (relativity)
 PSR J0737−3039

References

General relativity
Gravitational-wave astronomy
Equations of physics
Albert Einstein